Heinrich Wilhelm Blasius (1818–1899), later known as William Blasius was a German-born American meteorologist. He was elected as a member of the American Philosophical Society in 1875.

References

1818 births
1899 deaths
German meteorologists
German emigrants to the United States